Hans-Ulrich Millow (born 17 March 1942) is a German former swimmer. He competed in the men's 1500 metre freestyle at the 1960 Summer Olympics.

References

External links
 

1942 births
Living people
Olympic swimmers of the United Team of Germany
Swimmers at the 1960 Summer Olympics
Sportspeople from Mecklenburg-Western Pomerania
German male freestyle swimmers